GRL may refer to:

 G.R.L., an American-British-Canadian girl group
 G.R.L. (EP), a 2014 recording by G.R.L.
 Air Greenland
 Gamma Rho Lambda, a sorority
 Geospatial Research Laboratory
 Goal-oriented Requirements Language
 Greenfaulds railway station, in Scotland
 Glucocorticoid receptor